Burgos is a city in Spain.

Burgos may also refer to:

Places

Spain
 Province of Burgos, a province of the autonomous community of Castile and León
 Burgos (Spanish Congress Electoral District), which covers the province

Philippines
 Burgos, Ilocos Norte, a municipality
 Burgos, Ilocos Sur, a municipality
 Burgos, Isabela, a municipality
 Burgos, La Union, a municipality
 Burgos, Pangasinan, a municipality
 Burgos, Surigao del Norte, a municipality

Elsewhere
 Burgos, Sardinia, a comune (municipality) in Sassari Province
 Burgos Municipality, Tamaulipas, Mexico

People
 Ambiorix Burgos (born 1984), Major League Baseball player
 Carl Burgos (1918–1984), American comic book and advertising artist
 Dag Burgos (born 1966), Guatemalan Olympic cross-country skier
 Francisco de Burgos Mantilla (1612–1672), Spanish painter
 Gabriel Burgos Ortiz, Puerto Rican drag queen also known as Yara Sofia
 Germán Burgos (born 1969), Argentinian football player
 Javier de Burgos (1778–1848), Spanish writer and politician
 José Burgos (1837–1872), a Spanish-Filipino priest
 Julia de Burgos (1914–1953), Puerto Rican poet and civil-rights activist
 Kike Burgos (born 1971), Spanish football player
 Renata Burgos (born 1982), Brazilian freestyle swimmer
 Ricardo Burgos (born 1965), Guatemalan Olympic cross-country skier
 Shane Burgos, UFC Fighter

Other uses
 Roman Catholic Archdiocese of Burgos, encompassing almost all of the Province of Burgos, Spain
 Burgos CF, football club based in Burgos
 Real Burgos CF, football club based in Burgos
 Burgos Airport, an airport of Burgos, Castile and León
 Camisería Burgos, a bespoke shirtmaker in Madrid

See also
 Burgos (surname)
 Burgos Cathedral, a Roman Catholic cathedral in Burgos, Spain
 Padre Burgos, Quezon, Philippines
 Padre Burgos, Southern Leyte, Philippines
 Vuelta a Burgos, an elite men's professional road bicycle racing event held annually in the Burgos province, Castile and León
 Burgo (disambiguation)
 Burgas (disambiguation)